Florêncio Carlos de Abreu e Silva (October 20, 1839 in Porto Alegre – December 12, 1881 in Rio de Janeiro) was a lawyer, journalist, writer and politician from Brazil.

He was a member of the parliament of the province of Rio Grande do Sul, senator of Brazilian Empire and president of São Paulo (state) from April 7 to November 5, 1881.

References

External links
https://web.archive.org/web/20160304054150/http://memoria.ibge.gov.br/en/sinteses-historicas/galeria-da-presidentes/florencio-carlos-de-abreu-e-silva

1839 births
1881 deaths
Brazilian male writers
19th-century Brazilian lawyers
People from Porto Alegre
Governors of São Paulo (state)
Members of the Senate of the Empire of Brazil